Baron Harmsworth, of Egham in the County of Surrey, is a title in the Peerage of the United Kingdom. It was created in 1939 for the Liberal politician Cecil Harmsworth, Under-Secretary of State for Foreign Affairs between 1919 and 1922.  the title is held by his grandson, the third Baron, who succeeded his uncle in 1990.

The first Baron Harmsworth was the younger brother of Alfred Harmsworth, 1st Viscount Northcliffe, and Harold Harmsworth, 1st Viscount Rothermere and the elder brother of Sir Leicester Harmsworth, 1st Baronet, and Sir Hildebrand Harmsworth, 1st Baronet.

The family seat is The Old Rectory, near Stoke Abbott, Dorset.

Barons Harmsworth (1939)

 Cecil Bisshopp Harmsworth, 1st Baron Harmsworth (1869–1948)
 Cecil Desmond Bernard Harmsworth, 2nd Baron Harmsworth (1903–1990)
 Thomas Harold Raymond Harmsworth, 3rd Baron Harmsworth (b. 1939)

The heir apparent is the present holder's son, the Hon. Dominic Michael Eric Harmsworth (b. 1973)
The heir apparent's heir apparent is his eldest son, Thomas John Mark Harmsworth (b. 2003)

Male-line family tree

See also
 Viscount Northcliffe
 Viscount Rothermere
 Harmsworth baronets, of Moray Lodge, and Harmsworth baronets, of Freshwater Grove

Notes

References
 Kidd, Charles, Williamson, David (editors). Debrett's Peerage and Baronetage (1990 edition). New York: St Martin's Press, 1990, 
 

Baronies in the Peerage of the United Kingdom
Noble titles created in 1939
Noble titles created for UK MPs